3x3 basketball at the 2008 Asian Beach Games were held from 24–26 October 2008 in Bali, Indonesia.

Medalists

Medal table

Results

Men

Preliminaries

Group A

Group B

Final round

7th place match

5th place match

3rd place match

Final

Women

Preliminaries

Final round

3rd place match

Final

References
 Official website

2008
basketball
2008–09 in Asian basketball
2008–09 in Indonesian basketball
International basketball competitions hosted by Indonesia
2008 in 3x3 basketball